This is a list of trolleybus systems in the United Kingdom by Home Nation and by regions of England. It includes:
Past trolleybus systems in the UK.
Museums in the UK capable of running trolleybuses (i.e. possessing overhead wires and trolleybuses in working order).
There are currently no operational trolleybus systems in the UK.

In the United Kingdom the first trolleybus systems were inaugurated on 20 June 1911 in Bradford and Leeds, although public service in Bradford did not commence until 24 June. Coincidentally, the UK's last trolleybus service also operated in Bradford, on 26 March 1972.

England (by region)

East Midlands

East of England

Greater London

North East England

North West England

South East England

South West England

West Midlands

Yorkshire and the Humber

Scotland

Wales

Northern Ireland

Museums with working trolleybuses
 Black Country Living Museum
 East Anglia Transport Museum
 The Trolleybus Museum at Sandtoft
 Beamish Museum

See also

 List of trolleybus systems, for all other countries
 List of town tramway systems in the United Kingdom
 List of light-rail transit systems
 List of rapid transit systems
 Trolleybus usage by country

References

Notes

Further reading

External links

United Kingdom
 
trolleybus systems